Suzanne Marie Lee (née Kelley born November 7, 1966) is an American politician from the state of Nevada. A Democrat, she has served as the United States representative for Nevada's 3rd congressional district since 2019. Lee was the founding director of the Inner-City Games in Las Vegas and president of Communities In Schools of Nevada.

Early life and education 
Lee was born in Canton, Ohio, to Warren and Joan Kelley. She graduated from Carnegie Mellon University.

Early career 
After moving to Las Vegas in 1993, Lee became the founding director of the Inner-City Games, now known as the After-School All-Stars, which conducts after-school programs for children. Beginning in 2010, Lee served as the president of Communities In Schools of Nevada, a dropout prevention organization.

Lee has served on the Superintendent's Educational Opportunities Advisory Committee, Prime 6 Advisory Committee, Clark County School District English Language Learners Program Task Force, State Accountability Advisory Committee, UNLV's Lincy Institute Education Committee Advisory Board, and Guinn Center Board of Directors.

U.S. House of Representatives

Elections

2016 

She lost the primary to Ruben Kihuen by 19 points, placing third behind former State Assemblywoman Lucy Flores, who received 25.6% of the vote.

2018 

Lee won the seven-way primary election with 66.9% of the vote. She defeated Republican nominee Danny Tarkanian in the general election with 52% of the vote.

2020 

Lee ran for reelection to a second term. She won the three-way primary election with 82.8% of the vote. She defeated Republican nominee Dan Rodimer in the general election with 48.8% of the vote.

2022 

Lee was reelected in the 2022 elections. She defeated Republican April Becker, a lawyer in the general election with 52% of the vote.

Tenure
On December 18, 2019, Lee voted for both articles of impeachment against President Donald Trump.

In 2020, Lee lobbied the federal government to provide aid to Nevada's gaming industry. Federal agencies implemented the regulatory change she was seeking, which allowed businesses with fewer than 500 employees that derive more than half of their income from gaming to apply for Paycheck Protection Program loans. Two weeks after the change went into effect, Full House, a gambling company led by Lee's husband, secured two loans totaling $5.6 million. Lee said she became aware of the company's plan to apply for PPP loans several days before its loan application was submitted but had no role in its decision to apply. Lee and her husband own several millions of dollars in Full House stock and stock options.

In September 2021, it was reported that Lee had failed to properly disclose over 200 personal stock trades. The trades were estimated to be worth as much as $3.3 million.

As of June 2022, Lee had voted in line with Joe Biden's stated position 100% of the time.

Committee assignments
Committee on Education and Labor
Subcommittee on Civil Rights and Human Services
Subcommittee on Higher Education and Workforce Investment
 Committee on Veterans' Affairs
 Subcommittee on Economic Opportunity
 Subcommittee on Technology Modernization

Caucus memberships 
New Democrat Coalition
Problem Solvers Caucus

Electoral history

Personal life 
Lee lives in Las Vegas with her two children. She and her ex-husband Dan Lee announced their divorce in May 2021.

Lee is Roman Catholic.

See also
Women in the United States House of Representatives

References

External links

 Congresswoman Susie Lee official U.S. House website
 Campaign website

|-

1966 births
21st-century American politicians
21st-century American women politicians
American Roman Catholics
Candidates in the 2016 United States elections
Carnegie Mellon University alumni
Catholics from Nevada
Heinz College of Information Systems and Public Policy alumni
Democratic Party members of the United States House of Representatives from Nevada
Female members of the United States House of Representatives
Living people
Politicians from Canton, Ohio
Politicians from Las Vegas